Lopham Street Methodists F.C., (also known as Lopham Street United Methodists), was an English association football club based in Sheffield, South Yorkshire.

History 
Little is known of the club other than that they competed in the FA Cup in the 1930s.

League and cup history

Honours

League 
None

Cup 
 Sheffield & Hallamshire Senior Cup
 Runners-up: 1937–38

Records 
 Best FA Cup performance: Preliminary Round, 1938–39

References 

Defunct football clubs in England
Defunct football clubs in South Yorkshire
Sheffield Association League
Sheffield Amateur League